Church of Christ in LaRoche Township (also known as Academy Congregational Church) is a church in Academy, South Dakota. It was added to the National Register of Historic Places in 1982.

The church was built in three sections, the first being the original, one-story Church of Christ in LaRoche Township built in 1893. In 1902 a rear annex was added.

References

External links

Churches in South Dakota
Churches on the National Register of Historic Places in South Dakota
Churches completed in 1900
Churches in Charles Mix County, South Dakota
National Register of Historic Places in Charles Mix County, South Dakota